North Lochaber is a small community in the Canadian province of Nova Scotia, located  in Antigonish County. It is north of Lochaber on Nova Scotia Trunk 7 at the northern end of Lochaber Lake.

References

Communities in Antigonish County, Nova Scotia